Lost television broadcasts are mostly those early television programs which cannot be accounted for in studio archives (or in personal archives) usually because of deliberate destruction or neglect.

Common reasons for loss

A significant proportion of early television programming was never recorded in the first place. Early broadcasting in all genres was live and sometimes performed repeatedly. Due to there being no means to record the broadcast or, later, because the content itself was thought to have little monetary or historical value it was not deemed necessary to save it. In the United Kingdom, early programming was lost due to contractual demands by the actors' union to limit the rescreening of performances.

Apart from Phonovision experiments by John Logie Baird, and some 280 rolls of 35mm film containing some of Paul Nipkow television station broadcasts, no recordings of transmissions from 1939 or earlier are known to exist.

In 1947, Kinescopes (preserving the image on a monitor via an adapted cinematic film camera) became a practical method of recording broadcasts, but programs were only sporadically preserved by these means. Tele-snaps of British television broadcasts also began in 1947 but are necessarily incomplete. Magnetic videotape technologies became a viable method to record material in 1956 in the US via the cumbersome Quadruplex system using 2-inch wide tapes. Televised programming (especially that which was not considered viable for reruns) was still considered disposable. What was recorded was routinely destroyed by wiping and reusing the tapes. The home video industry only developed from the late 1970s providing a new outlet for release.

The ability for home viewers to record programming was extremely limited before videotape; although a home viewer could record the video of a broadcast onto 8 mm film throughout television history or record the audio of a broadcast onto audiotape beginning in the 1950s, one could generally not capture both on the same medium until super-8 debuted in the 1960s. Home movies of this kind are exceptionally rare. Audio recordings are more common and numerous copies of otherwise lost television broadcasts exist.

Wiping
Wiping, also known as junking, is a colloquial term for action taken by radio and television production and broadcasting companies, in which old audiotapes, videotapes, and kinescopes (telerecordings), are erased and reused, or destroyed. Although the practice was once very common, especially in the 1960s and 1970s, wiping is now much less frequent.

Older video and audio formats were expensive (relative to the amount of material that could be stored) and took up a lot of storage space, making retention costly. There was more incentive to recycle the media for reuse or, in the case of film media, for any silver content than to preserve the recording. This increased the incentive to discard existing broadcast material to recover storage space and material for newer programs.

The advent of domestic audiovisual playback technology (e.g. the videocassette and DVD, and particularly with the rise of digital media in the 1990s) has made wiping less beneficial, as the cost of producing and maintaining copies of telecasts dropped dramatically. In addition, broadcasters also later realized how much commercial potential from home video, cable television, and online streaming usage of their archived material was possible and that served as a strong economic incentive to preserve all recordings. Over time this came to include scenes not originally broadcast due to time constraints and outtakes not originally used whether due to mistakes on the part of cast or crew or for some other reason – once producers and distributors realized there was significant demand for such content especially from devoted fans of their programs, they preserved the content to be marketed later (especially on home video releases).

To the extent that wiping still exists, it is primarily used when it is deemed necessary for content to be irrevocably expunged for legal or ethical reasons (such as when there is concern the content might be illicitly obtained and/or used for unlawful and/or inappropriate purposes), or alternatively to erase ephemeral content with little to no intrinsic value.

Australia
Like most other countries, only a small portion of the early decades of Australian TV programming has survived. Many economic, technical, social and regulatory forces combined to prevent large-scale preservation of Australian programs from this period, and also contributed to the later destruction of most of what was recorded at the time. There was, and is, no regulatory requirement to lodge copies of programs with an archive authority such as the National Library of Australia.

In the first decade of Australian TV, 1956–1966, Australia produced very little original local drama content, compared to other English-speaking nations. From the introduction of TV in Australia in 1956 to around 1964, the commercial stations did produce their own programmes,  but the  majority of locally produced original programming was made by the government-funded Australian Broadcasting Commission. By June 1964, the ABC had produced 185 of the 212 plays, all 31 operas, and 90 of the 95 ballets shown on Australian TV in that period. Some of this was recorded, but little of that material has survived. One of the best-known and most often seen surviving recordings from this period is the footage that purports to be the recording of the inaugural broadcast of TCN-9 Sydney on 16 September 1956, but this is in fact a fabrication – the actual broadcast was not recorded at the time, so the station restaged it some days later, for archival and promotional purposes.

In this early period, the technology then available to pre-record television programs, or to record live broadcasts off-air, was relatively primitive. Although Australia introduced TV rather later (1956) than other nations like the USA, the use of videotape did not become widespread in the Australian industry until the early 1960s, so only a small number of episodes from the earliest period have survived. Nearly all of that material exists as kinescopes.

Although many important ABC programs from these early days were captured as kinescopes, most of this material was later lost or destroyed. In a 1999 newspaper article on the subject, author Bob Ellis recounted the story of a large collection of kinescopes of early ABC drama productions, and other programs, including some of the first Australian TV Shakespeare productions, and the pioneering popular music show Six O'Clock Rock. Learning that the ABC planned to dispose of these recordings, Bruce Beresford (then a production assistant at the ABC), arranged for a friend to pose as a silver nitrate dealer, and the anonymous collector purchased the films for a nominal cost. Subsequently, the collector occasionally rented some of the films out to schools for a small fee, but the daughter of one of the actors involved (Owen Weingott) recognised her father from a Shakespeare production, and told him about it. Assuming that the ABC still owned the print and was making money out of these recordings without compensating the actors, Weingott lodged an official complaint. Commonwealth police descended on the illegal collector, but he was warned that they were coming, and in a panic he destroyed almost all the material he possessed.

Well into the 1970s, it was still common for news, current affairs, sports coverage, game shows, talk/panel shows, infotainment programs and variety shows to be broadcast live, and these were usually not recorded. In this early period, recording and editing TV shows on videotape was expensive and time-consuming, and because of the comparatively lower cost, and the high level of skill available to Australian TV networks in live broadcasting, and the lack of any market for such recordings, pre-recording or archiving of most day-to-day TV content was considered unnecessary and uneconomical. Although some news and other programming from this period has survived, most of what is still extant is material that was captured on film (such as actuality footage, interviews, press conferences, etc., recorded for news stories).

Another factor, common to all countries, was that before domestic video technology was introduced in the 1970s, there was generally no economic motive for Australian TV to make or keep recordings of most TV shows, except in the case of pre-produced mainstream documentary, comedy or drama programs that could be sold to other stations in Australia, or to broadcasters overseas (e.g. Skippy The Bush Kangaroo). Likewise, virtually no private recordings exist of Australian TV material produced before domestic video was introduced, because viewers had no practical means to record programs off-air.

Before reliable, high-quality inter-city cable and satellite links were established, some Australian programs of the 1960s were routinely videotaped, usually for distribution to affiliate stations in other states – like the popular In Melbourne Tonight with Graham Kennedy – but the vast majority of these program tapes were later erased, or simply destroyed.

Even after videotape was well-established in Australian TV production, the practice of erasing and reusing tapes was common in both commercial TV and the ABC, and this continued well into the 1970s. Only a very small portion surviving of the many thousands of hours of videotaped programming made during the 1960s and early 1970s survives. The majority of ABC-TV's mainstream original content (including comedy, drama, variety, news and current affairs) was produced in-house; consequently these programs all suffered considerable losses due to the corporation's policy of reusing videotape – a practice further exacerbated by budget cuts in the 1970s. In one notorious case, a controversial installment of the 1970s ABC comedy series The Off Show (the infamous "Leave It To Jesus" episode) was lost because the show's producer vehemently objected to its religious satire, and deliberately erased the master tape the night before it was due to be broadcast.

Notable losses include:

 most of the 1969–1971 episodes of the ABC's weekly current affairs discussion show Monday Conference;
 This Day Tonight (ABC TV's groundbreaking nightly current affairs show) – most of the in-studio segments and other pre-recorded video segments were later wiped, although a small proportion of recorded reports survive because it was still common at the time (late 1960s-early 1970s) that location footage for feature stories was shot and edited on film before transfer to video for broadcast, so some of these film sources have survived.
 the vast majority of episodes the numerous Australian TV pop shows that flourished in the 1960s and early 1970s (many of which emanated from Channel 0 in Melbourne) including The Go!! Show, Kommotion, Uptight and the 'Happening 70 / 71 / 72' series
 many episodes of the pioneering Australian prime time soap opera Number 96, despite the fact that it was independently produced in-house for the 0–10 Network.

All the episodes from the first 12 months (1969–1970) of the ABC's music magazine series GTK are now lost. The majority of the material recorded for the post-1970 episodes was rediscovered in ABC archives and storerooms in the early 2000s, when the ABC closed and sold off its Gore Hill, Sydney studio complex. This is due to most of the GTK program segments being recorded on film (in an older part of the studio complex) and then transferred to video for broadcast. Although many broadcast masters were wiped, many more were rescued and hidden by the program's later producer, Bernie Cannon, and nearly all the post-1970 filmed segments, including the archive of live-in-studio performances by local bands, have survived.

Other shows suddenly missing from the archives include most of the first three years' of Countdown (episodes beyond 1978 of Countdown have survived in this manner), nearly all of the hundreds of 15-minute episodes of the ABC's popular soap Bellbird, two thirds of all the taped 166 episodes from the ABC's Certain Women, and a large proportion of the Ten Network's hugely popular Young Talent Time from the 1971–1976 era. Much of the early years of Nine's then-Saturday Morning children's program Hey Hey it's Saturday was unrecorded, and many episodes recorded in the early 1970s have since been erased.

Some programs or segments of programs from the mid 1970s onwards have been retrieved from people's home taping shows off-air (portions of Young Talent Time and Countdown have survived in this manner).

No footage is known to exist of the Melbourne version of Tell the Truth.

General lack of repeats of 1950s and 1960s Australian series makes it difficult to know what is extant and what is lost. For example, there is no information available as to whether any episodes still exist of Take That (1957–1959), sometimes considered to the first Australian television sitcom. Information on archival status is also lacking for other 1950s-era series like The Isador Goodman Show (1956–1957), It Pays to Be Funny (1957–1958), Sweet and Low (1959), among others.

Some of the best-known survivors of this period are comedy or drama series commissioned and broadcast by the ABC's commercial rivals. Frequently, these were outsourced productions made by private companies, such as the many drama series made by Melbourne-based Crawford Productions (a production brand of WIN Television), which at its peak in the 1970s had major primetime series running concurrently on all three Australian commercial networks. Crawfords retained the rights to its productions, and was able to earn money from reruns, so most of its production output was preserved. Crawford is now unique in Australian TV history because it still owns and markets a comprehensive archive of all its major productions from the 1960s and beyond, including Homicide, Division 4, Matlock Police, and The Sullivans.

The National Film and Sound Archive holdings of 1950s era shows include several episodes of the 1957 discussion series Leave it to the Girls, most of the 1958–1959 soap opera Autumn Affair, and a number of episodes of the comedy game show The Pressure Pak Show. These shows, produced by ATN-7 in Sydney, probably survive because they were pre-recorded for the purpose of interstate broadcast (Autumn Affair, despite primitive production values, was repeated into the 1960s).

ABC
The Australian Broadcasting Corporation (ABC) erased much of its early produced output. Much of the videotaped ABC programme material from the 1960s and early 1970s was erased as part of an economy policy instituted in the late 1970s in which old programme tapes were surrendered for bulk erasure and reuse. This policy particularly targeted older programmes recorded in black-and-white, leading to the loss of many recordings made before early 1976, when the real reason is that Australian television converted to colour. The ABC continued erasing older television output until the late 1970s.

Programmes known to have been produced then lost include most studio segments and stories from the 1960s current affairs shows This Day Tonight and Monday Conference, hundreds of episodes of the long-running rural serial Bellbird, all but a handful of episodes of the early-1970s drama series Certain Women, an early-1970s miniseries of dramatizations based on Norman Lindsay's novels, and nearly all of the pre-1978 episodes of the weekly pop-music show Countdown.

Network Ten
Many produced episodes of popular Australian commercial TV series are also lost. In the 1970s, Network Ten had an official policy to reuse tapes; hence, many tapes of Young Talent Time and Number 96 were wiped. To this day, Network Ten still only keeps some of its programming. Other notable losses from the Ten archive include hundreds of episodes of the Melbourne-based pop music shows commissioned and broadcast by ATV-0 Melbourne in the 1960s and early 1970s—The Go!! Show (1964–1967), Kommotion (1964–1967), Uptight (1968–70), and the Happening 70s series (1970–1972).

Nine Network
The Nine Network discarded copies of some of their programs, including the popular GTV-9 series In Melbourne Tonight starring Graham Kennedy. Though it ran five nights a week from 1957 to 1970, fewer than 100 episodes are known to survive, and many of the surviving episodes are edited prints made for rebroadcast across Australia. Early episodes of breakfast show Hey Hey It's Saturday do not exist because the programme was broadcast live and did not begin live videotape recordings until a number of years later.

Bangladesh
From 1964 to 1967, all TV programs were recorded on film in what was then East Pakistan (until 1971). Then in 1967, VTR recording was introduced to record their TV programs in high quality. Bangladesh Television rarely practiced wiping since its archive has been carefully maintained.

Brazil
From 1968 to 1969, Rede Tupi produced new episodes of the telenovela Beto Rockfeller by recording over previous episodes; as a result, few episodes survive. After the closure of TV Tupi in 1980 the 536 tapes at its São Paulo studios were transported to a warehouse in the São Paulo suburb of Cotia and were simply left to deteriorate there until they were recovered by the Cinemateca Brasileira in 1985 and subsequently restored by TV Cultura in 1989. Only two Rede Tupi owned and operated stations are known to have any preserved videotapes; TV Itacolomi's archives are now owned by TV Alterosa, the Minas Gerais affiliate of SBT in Belo Horizonte, whereas almost all of TV Piratini's material was lost in a fire in 1983, two years after the building of the extinct station was occupied by TVE-RS, the statewide public television station in Rio Grande do Sul. The few  TV Piratini surviving tapes are stored at the Hipólito José da Costa Communication Museum, in Porto Alegre, albeit in a heavily deteriorated state. Also, some tapes at the Rede Tupi studios in Urca, Rio de Janeiro were later found to have been significantly degraded by vinegar syndrome, hence they were unable to be migrated to a modern format. However, part of the library of Rio de Janeiro TV Tupi studios was found in 2005 at the headquarters of Radio Tupi, and later donated to the Brazilian National Archive, which signed an agreement with Globo in 2007 to preserve the material.

RecordTV also lost much footage from the 1960s due to wiping, fires, and deterioration; most of the MPB music festivals no longer exist, and the sitcom Família Trapo (pt) has only one surviving episode, featuring Pelé. Until 1997, Rede Record had no policy on archiving videotapes; since then, at least 600 videotapes that were previously believed to be lost have been recovered with the help of the Ressoar Institute.

Globo lost the first 35 broadcasts of Fantástico and most of the first years of Jornal Nacional, in addition to many segments of their other soap operas as a result of wiping, and also due to three fires that occurred in 1969 (at its São Paulo studios), 1971 and 1976, (the latter two at its Rio de Janeiro studios) where in the 1976 fire, an estimated 920 to 1,500 tapes were destroyed.

Most of TV Excelsior's output was damaged in a fire in 1969; however, in the late 1990s about 100 tapes of Rede Excelsior programming were discovered in the archives of Globo and TV Gazeta and these tapes were restored by the Faculdade Cásper Líbero and subsequently donated to the Cinemateca Brasileira in 2001.

The Brazilian public television network Cultura has preserved many old programs and has one of the most complete archives among Brazilian television networks. Despite having suffered a fire in 1986, this fire did not reach the station's archives.

After the bankruptcy of Manchete, in 1999, most of the collection was seized at the station's studios, in Rio de Janeiro, until it was included in the bankruptcy estate and later auctioned by the Brazilian courts, which caused part of the library to be lost. However, some telenovelas (such as Pantanal) had reruns by some television networks (such as SBT and Band).

Many SBT 1980s and 1990s productions were lost due to wiping and also due to floods that occurred in 1987 and in 1991 at its studios in the district of Vila Guilherme. The network did not have a archiving policy until 1996, when the network moved its studios to CDT da Anhanguera in Osasco, Greater São Paulo.

Canada
The Canadian Broadcasting Corporation never practiced wiping of programs they produced themselves. As a result, the CBC now maintains a nearly complete archive of all programming produced by them that was recorded. 
One exception was the 1953–54 science-fiction series Space Command, of which only one out of 150 episodes are known to survive, although the whole series was Kinescoped for distribution to stations across Canada. The CBC also says that the 1984–93 music video series, Video Hits, no longer exists in their archives; presumably, any recordings were wiped for legal reasons as the show used content licensed from music companies.

The CTV Television Network has admitted to wiping many programs during the 1970s. Because of Canadian content requirements, the need for Canadian-produced programming led to more preservation of the shows they produced, and even very poorly received programs (such as The Trouble with Tracy) were saved and rerun for several years after their cancellation. Furthermore, Canadian rebroadcasts have been a source of some programming their producers in the United States and the United Kingdom have lost.

Chile
A large portion of the publicly-owned TVN's archives between 1969 to 1973 were burned by the military during the coup in 1973. Only a few films in 1969 and 1970 are known to survive, including a still frame featuring the company's logo at the time, and the text Desde Arica, hasta Tierra del Fuego (From Arica, to Tierra del Fuego), as well as several idents featuring its mascot at the time, Tevito, which also included the mascot being crushed by the TVN logo.

Europe
The first edition ever of the Eurovision Song Contest of 1956 was broadcast live and only a sound recording of the radio transmission and a section of the winning song's reprise has survived from the original broadcast. The ninth edition of 1964 is said to have been recorded on tape, but a fire reportedly destroyed the copy at DR, the Danish broadcaster who produced the contest. Another recording of the contest was thought to have existed at the French television archives, but it has since been revealed that this is not the case. Only small portions of the original broadcast and audio from the radio transmission are accessible for the time being.

Belgium
 Only 9 of the 185 episodes of the Flemish sitcom Schipper naast Mathilde from 1955 to 1963 survive.
 Most Flemish youth series from the 1950s were not preserved: Bolletje en Bonestaak (1955), Jan zonder Vrees (John the Fearless, 1956), Schatteneiland (Treasure Island, 1957), Reis om de wereld in 80 dagen (Around the World in 80 Days, 1957), and Professor Kwit (1958). The series Manko Kapak (1959) is an exception and survives on kinescope.
 Only 3 of the 12 episodes of the Flemish courtroom drama series Beschuldigde sta op from the 1960s to 1980 survive.

Czechia 
State-controlled Czech television started broadcasting in 1953. Early broadcastings were live and mostly not recorded. Only small part, about 5 - 10% of Czech TV production from 1950s, mostly news and art production, is preserved. Later, the amount of programs being recored for permanent storage increased, especially with usage of video recording since 1967.

In the beginning, Czech Television didn't have enough of its own storage space to accommodate the constantly growing number of archives, so it had to store its recordings at various rented external locations. The repositories were located in rented bunkers, a barn, a pub, or even a church. Further growth in the number of archives led to the establishment of new, larger repositories and constant relocation of archives. During the 1960s and 1970s, Czech Television's repositories were scattered in up to 10 locations. Recordings were often stored in unsuitable conditions - suffering from moisture, pressure, or inappropriate temperature. This resulted in damage to many recordings, which is still evident today.

A change occurred in 1996 when the new building was completed in Kavčí Hory in Prague. All materials were relocated to the new repository with strictly controlled storage conditions and restoration of damaged materials began.

The Brno studio of Czech Television also stored its film reels in high humidity. These reels were also transported to the new Prague repository. It was discovered that 50% of these film reels were affected by vinegar syndrome due to poor storage conditions. Films affected by vinegar syndrome are continually duplicated.

In 1997, the archive of the Czech Television studio in Ostrava was flooded during a flood. The flood destroyed 30,000 news film shots, 6,000 films, 2,000 video tapes, 9,000 scripts, 10,000 photographs, half of the sound archive and the costume department and the props warehouse.

After the floods, the damaged archives were immediately transported to Prague, and the labor-intensive cleaning and duplication process began. Some of the damaged recordings were thus successfully saved. The flooded film reels are still stored in the repository. 

Since 2006, a systematic digitization of all analog media in the Czech Television archive has been taking place.

Greece
The vast majority of Greek television shows before the 1980s are considered lost, as ERT never took archiving seriously. Recent efforts have been made to archive what is left, but the material is very limited.

Ireland
The Republic of Ireland was a latecomer to television, Telefís Éireann being established at the end of 1961. Although early news broadcasts were recorded on kinescopes, almost all broadcasts from the first fifteen years (i.e. up to 1977) are lost. Of the soap opera Tolka Row (1964–68) only the last episode survives, while almost all the early episodes of The Late Late Show (1962–present) are lost. Even when shows were sent abroad — The Riordans was sent to Australia for rebroadcast — the tapes were often sent back to Ireland and recorded over, as they were so expensive.

Italy
The 23rd, 24th and 25th editions of the Italian Sanremo Festival of 1973, 1974 and 1975 have been lost. Only some portions of the original tapes have survived in the Daily News Archives. The 26th edition of 1976 was lost by RAI but it could be recovered in the Spanish Broadcasting Company's (TVE) vaults, since it was broadcast all around Europe and recorded by TVE.

Many early RAI television programs were not preserved. Only a few episodes of the game show Lascia o raddoppia? have survived and no recording of the musical variety Settevoci is extant.

Netherlands
The best known missing programs are the children's shows Ja zuster nee zuster from the 1960s and most of Hamelin (Kunt u mij de weg naar Hamelen vertellen) from the 1970s.

The 1970s Dutch TV series The Eddy-Go-Round Show hosted by Eddy Becker, despite featuring high-profile guests, is reported to have been largely erased by the broadcaster it aired on, though a short section featuring Swedish pop group ABBA performing "I Do, I Do, I Do, I Do, I Do" was later uncovered on a tape recorded by a home viewer. An additional episode was later uncovered as the host had kept a copy himself, and was later re-broadcast on a Dutch cable channel in 2012. A clip of Marmalade performing on the show also has survived. A further clip of Olivia Newton-John performing was found by Ray Langstone in 2013.

Spain
Hundreds of episodes from the internationally versioned show Un, dos, tres... responda otra vez, mainly from the first two seasons (1972–1973 and 1976–1978), including the first episode of the first season, are lost or were destroyed. Only four episodes out of 54 from the first season and 12 out of 83 from the second season are known to survive. The following seasons from the third to the fifth one (1982–1986) are also incomplete, but not as dramatically diminished as the previous seasons. The sixth season of 1987 is the first fully located and preserved one. Since Televisión Española archives were not catalogued until 1987, and there are thousands of tapes in kilometers of shelves of unknown uncatalogued content, there could be more episodes there than what is preserved today (the last previously thought lost then found episode from the first season was just discovered in 2005). Also, some of the lost episodes of seasons two, three, four and five exist as either complete or as portions on the archives or on home video recordings made by members of the public.

UK

Yugoslavia (SFR)
Yugoslav Radio Television (JRT) practiced wiping until the 1970s when it gained access to newer and cheaper methods of recording, which allowed it to regularly archive programming.

Japan
Of the original 1973 Doraemon 31 segments are lost due to the studio warehouse that stored all content of the show, having to sell the reels off for money, which ultimately failed in the end. The show only lasted for 26 episodes—it was interrupted due to the dissolution of Nippon TV Video, the production studio. 21 episodes are known to survive, two of which have no audio. The final episode was called "Sayonara Doraemon" (Goodbye Doraemon) and aired on September 30, 1973. Audio, still images, the opening theme and ending theme survive all together. In 1995, 16 episodes were found to be stored in Studio Rush (now known as IMAGICA), and other segments have been found, though two remain without their audio tracks. The opening and ending credits do still exist as well, along with a pilot film that was produced in 1972. These are occasionally shown at Doraemon fan conventions in Japan, but cannot be released legally on DVD owing to rights complications due to the production studio being defunct. It was briefly rebroadcast in 1979, but was abruptly pulled off television by order of Shogakukan, who did not want the new adaptation's reputation to be affected by the existence of the previous one.

The entirety of the Nippon TV tokusatsu television series Assault! Human!!, originally produced and aired in 1972, was lost at some point after the series was rebroadcast in the 1980s, after the master tapes were reused. While suits from the show were purchased, then reused by Toho in the 1973 series Go! Greenman, the only traces of Assault! Human!! come in the form of supplementary materials such as reference books, merchandise, magazine articles and the show's soundtrack.

All episodes of the Osamu Tezuka anime Big X are said to be lost except for episodes 1, 11, and 40–59. Only episodes 37 and 38 of Space Alien Pipi survive, along with the opening and ending theme. Certain episodes of Perman are lost, some have picture but no audio.

Most episodes of the Children's puppet show Hyokkori Hyōtanjima, running from 1964 to 1969 on NHK for total of 1,224 episodes, were reportedly wiped after the broadcast. The tapes were reportedly reused for other programs since video tapes were costly. 6 episodes have resurfaced from black and white kinescopes, as well as 2 color episodes.

Toei Animation is known to wipe broadcasts of older anime series. For a time, the original films of Dragon Ball, Dragon Ball Z, and some of Dragon Ball GT, which contained high-quality audio, were wiped. They were considered lost media until a group of fans collected VHS recordings of the series during their original broadcasts, which contained the original audio. The audio was then sent to Christopher Sabat of Funimation. An official release of these series containing the original audio has yet to be made.

Mexico
Due to its multiple studio facilities, namely its Chapultepec and San Ángel studios, Televisa preserved most of its scripted series for broadcast years after the preserved programs had ended their original runs. Some Televisa programs, however, were lost in the 1985 Mexico City earthquake that destroyed part of the network's archive. However, smaller channels, such as XEIPN-TV and XHDF-TV, did not begin to preserve their recorded broadcasts until the early 1980s. Monterrey's Multimedios Televisión keeps most of its programming, though some special historical programming dealing with its flagship station's history clearly shows that some footage has been either donated by viewers recorded from its original broadcast, or uses footage of its programming recorded by archivists.

Pakistan
In the early days of PTV, a few test transmissions were broadcast, but the majority of programming was live. Since at the time PTV did not have the tools needed to create backups, the programming was considered lost as soon as it aired.

Pre-recorded shows started airing in 1971, stored mostly using Video Tape Recorders (VTR) and later shifting to VPRs. Both were stored in spools.

Final archive cuts of aired shows were stored in a near-freezing room, which was the standard storage requirement. However, sometime in the early 1980s, the air conditioning for archives was turned down too much, causing the spools to succumb to the heat and fuse together.

When the industry finally realised in early 1990s that transfer to digital video was imminent, the equipment needed to play back the old spools was no longer in working condition and replacement parts were almost nonexistent.

The spools were stored at the Shalimar recording company, and PTV has been able to play segments for retrospective programs.

Additionally, viewer home recordings also exist and are the only source of video for some shows.

The Center for Media Psychology Research Pakistan website gives a different story, stating that after the switch to colour broadcast, the recording medium in the 1970s was the one inch spool format which recorded sound and electronic moving pictures as a combined stream on a magnetic recording medium. However, due to the one inch magnetic spool containing all old archives was eventually lost.

Philippines
The first three years (1979 to 1982) of the longest-running television show in the Philippines, Eat Bulaga!, have been lost. The first full surviving episode was broadcast on August 7, 1982, the third anniversary of the show.

The inaugural game of the Philippine Basketball Association (PBA) in 1975, along with most of the games that were broadcast during the first seven seasons of the league, are believed to be lost. The oldest known full game archive of the league was from the 1979 season. Most of the league's playoffs games, including a significant number of games involving Ginebra, were missing in the PBA archives, when the archive was digitized in 2010. Short clips of older games are in possession of private collectors.

The television archive of ABS-CBN Corporation from 1953 to 1972 are believed lost, when the station was taken over by the government of Ferdinand Marcos when he declared martial law in the country. In addition, ABS-CBN alleged in its complaint-affidavit filed after the People Power Revolution against Roberto Benedicto (who took over ABS-CBN's facilities following the declaration of martial law) that "the musical records and radio dramas accumulated by ABS-CBN in a span of twenty-five (25) years and stored in its library were now gone".

The status of the archived broadcasts of Banahaw Broadcasting Corporation, the television network that took over ABS-CBN's facilities from 1973 to 1986 is unknown. An audio recording of the daily sign off as well as a video recording of a 10-second station ID are known to exist.

United Kingdom

Recording technology and rights
Drama and entertainment output was studio-based and followed the tradition of live theatre and radio drama. The earliest recording method for television was telerecording (Kinescope in the US), first used in 1947, which involved capturing the image from a special television monitor onto film using a modified film camera. increased in use during the 1950s, and surviving UK programmes which were not pre-filmed usually exist in this form until the late 1960s. Conventional filmmaking methods, other than for factual programming, were only gradually introduced from the mid-1960s.

All television programmes have copyright and secondary rights associated with them. For drama and entertainment, the actors, writers, and musicians involved in a production all have underlying rights. In the past, these rights were defended rigorously—permission could even be denied by a contributor for the repeat or re-use of a programme. Talent unions were highly suspicious of the threat to new work if programmes were repeated; indeed, before 1955 Equity insisted that any telerecording made (of a repeat performance) could only "be viewed privately" on BBC premises and not transmitted.

The Sunday Night Play (a major event in the 1950s) was performed live in the studio. On following Thursdays, because telerecording was then of insufficient broadcast quality, another live performance was broadcast, the artists returning to perform the play again. Black Limelight is a stage play which was adapted for British television three times, with each version being lost. These include a 1952 version as part of Sunday Night Theatre, which was broadcast live and not recorded, a 1956 version as part of Armchair Theatre and a 1962 version as part of BBC Sunday-Night Play.

Although the Quadruplex videotape system was used in the UK from 1958, this system was expensive and complex; recorded programmes were often erased after broadcast in an era when the UK had few channels and repeats were rare. Videotape was not initially thought to be a permanent archivable medium – its high cost and the potential reuse of the tapes led to the transfer of programme material to film, via telerecording, whenever sales of overseas screening rights were possible or preservation deemed worthwhile. The recycling of videotapes, coupled with savings made on the storage of the bulky 2" tapes, enabled costs to be kept down.

The introduction of colour television in the United Kingdom from 1967 meant that broadcasters felt there was less value in retaining monochrome recordings. Such tapes could not be re-used for colour production, so they were disposed of to create space for the new colour tapes in the archives, which were quickly filling up. The increased cost of colour Quadruplex videotape—approximately £1,000 per tape at today's prices—meant that companies still often re-used the tapes for cost control purposes. Negative attitudes to a programme's value also persisted. Some early colour productions were telerecorded onto monochrome film for overseas sales to countries which did not yet have colour television. Early colour programmes may only survive in this form.

Today, most programmes are pre-recorded and it is relatively inexpensive to preserve programming for posterity.

BBC
The BBC, the United Kingdom's first public service broadcaster, had no policy on archiving until 1978.

The early years in Britain
The BBC's television service dates back to 1936 and was originally a nearly live-only medium. The hours of transmission were very limited and the bulk of the programming was transmitted either live from the studio, or from outside broadcast (OB) units; film was a minor contributor to the output. When the first television broadcasts were made, there were two competing systems in use. The EMI electronic system (using 405 lines) competed with the Baird 240-line mechanical television system. Baird adopted an intermediate film technique where the live material was filmed using a standard film camera mounted on a large cabinet which contained a rapid processing unit and an early flying spot scanner to produce the video output for transmission. The pioneer broadcasts were not, however, preserved on this intermediate film as the nitrate (celluloid) stock was scanned while still wet from the fixer bath and never washed to remove the fixer chemicals. Consequently, the film decomposed very soon after transmission; nothing is known to have survived. No studio or OB programmes from 1936 to 1939 or 1946 to 1947 have survived because there was no means of preserving them.

The world's earliest television crime drama Telecrime (1938–39 and 1946) or Pinwright's Progress (1946–47, the world's first regular situation comedy), The Disorderly Room, Sports Review, Theatre Parade, and the play Wasp's Nest, were broadcast live and not recorded. The only visual evidence of these programmes today consists of still photographs as live programmes were never recorded at all.

Lost programmes
Four of the six episodes of The Quatermass Experiment (1953), Britain's first science fiction television programme aimed at an adult audience, were never recorded; the two existing episodes are the BBC's earliest recordings of any fictional series. The visual quality of the second episode's recording was considered so poor—a fly entered the gap between the camera and monitor at one point—that the remainder of the series was not recorded.

High-profile examples of programme losses include the vast majority of the BBC's Apollo 11 Moon landing studio coverage, and all 147 episodes of the soap opera United!. There are gaps in many long-running BBC series (Dixon of Dock Green, Sykes, Out of the Unknown, and Z-Cars). Three episodes from the second series of Dad's Army are missing, as are 26 episodes of Hancock's Half Hour.

The Madhouse on Castle Street, a 1963 BBC teleplay starring a then-unknown Bob Dylan, is considered lost. It was erased in 1968, and despite attempts by the British Film Institute to recover it, a telerecorded copy has still not been found . A for Andromeda, a science fiction series that was Julie Christie's first major role, only survives in the form of a single episode (episode six, "The Face of the Tiger"), some film fragments from episodes one ("The Message"), two ("The Machine"), three ("The Miracle") and seven ("The Last Mystery"), and a complete audio recording of episode seven.

As of 2023, 97 black and white episodes of the BBC science-fiction series Doctor Who are not known to survive, all from the tenures of the first two Doctors, William Hartnell and Patrick Troughton (see Doctor Who missing episodes). Audio recordings survive for all of the lost episodes and have been released commercially by the BBC. Several episodes of some serials, including The Invasion, The Reign of Terror, The Power of the Daleks and The Ice Warriors (all episodes only surviving in audio form), were reconstructed using animation for DVD releases. The BBC holds many clips from the lost episodes ranging from such sources as an 8 mm camera, censored clips physically cut from the episodes, insert shots, and clips shown on 1960s and 1970s programmes (such as  Blue Peter). In late 2013, five previously missing episodes of The Enemy of the World and four of the five missing episodes of The Web of Fear were recovered from a television relay station in Nigeria. The only episode thought to be definitively irrecoverable is "The Feast of Steven", from the 1965–1966 serial The Daleks' Master Plan, mainly due to the episode being the only one to have no known copies Send to foreign TV Stations and its Mastertape wiped.

The BBC wiped many editions of Not Only... But Also, starring Peter Cook and Dudley Moore from its archives in the late 1960s and early 1970s. Cook and Moore reportedly offered to pay for the cost of preservation and buy new videotapes so that the old tapes would not need to be reused, but this offer was rejected. Some telerecordings of the black and white episodes survive, but the completed programmes on  colour videotape of the 1970 series was wiped, so that the only surviving colour sketches are the 16mm film inserts.

Only two episodes of the drama documentary Crisis Command, which aired in 2004, are currently known to exist online.

There is lost material in all genres — as late as the early 1990s, a large number of videotaped children's programmes from the 1970s and 1980s were irretrievably wiped by the BBC archives on the assumption that they were of "low priority", without consulting the BBC children's department itself.

Other lost material
Virtually the entire runs of the corporation's pre-1970s soap operas have been lost. In the 1950s and 1960s, the BBC soap operas The Appleyards, The Grove Family, Compact, The Newcomers, 199 Park Lane, and United! produced approximately 1,200 episodes altogether. There are no episodes of either United! or 199 Park Lane in the archives, while only one episode of The Appleyards, three episodes of The Grove Family, and four episodes each of Compact and The Newcomers are known to exist. The early televised Francis Durbridge serials from 1952 to 1959 were either never recorded (the first two, Broken Horseshoe and Operation Diplomat) or not retained.

Also vulnerable to the corporation's wiping policy were programmes that only lasted for one series. Abigail and Roger, The Airbase, As Good Cooks Go, the 1960 adaptation of The Citadel, the 1956 adaptation of David Copperfield, The Dark Island, The Gnomes of Dulwich, Hurricane, For Richer...For Poorer, Hereward the Wake, The Naked Lady, Night Train To Surbiton, Outbreak of Murder, Where do I Sit?, and Witch Hunt have all been wiped, with no footage surviving, while four out of seven episodes of the paranormal anthology series Dead of Night were wiped. Only about 30 episodes of Dixon of Dock Green remain out of a run of 432, and more than half of the episodes of Z-Cars are missing.

An edition of Hugh and I ("Chinese Crackers"), starring Hugh Lloyd, Terry Scott, John Le Mesurier and David Jason was located by Kaleidoscope Publishing in 2010 in the archives of UCLA, and brought to general public attention in February 2011.

Episodes of the pop music chart show Top of the Pops from its first decade were wiped or, if transmitted live, not recorded. The Beatles' only live appearance on Top Of The Pops in 1966, performing the single "Paperback Writer" is believed to have been wiped in a clear-out in the 1970s. An off-air recording of 11 seconds of footage made on an 8mm film camera was discovered in April 2019. Clips of the Beatles miming "Can't Buy Me Love" and "You Can't Do That" on an episode from 25 March 1964 were found online by missing episode hunter Ray Langstone in 2015. The last lost edition dates from 8 September 1977. There are only four complete TOTP episodes surviving from the 1960s, while many otherwise-missing episodes survive only as fragments. Most appearances of Pink Floyd with Syd Barrett—are unavailable. Only two episodes still exist of The Sandie Shaw Supplement (a music-variety show hosted by the eponymous singer), recorded in 1967.

Finding missing BBC programmes
Since the establishment of an archival policy for television in 1978, BBC archivists and others over the years have used various contacts in the UK and abroad to try to track down missing programmes. For example, all BBC Worldwide customers—broadcasters around the world—who had bought programmes from the corporation were contacted to see if they still had copies which could be returned; Doctor Who is a prime example of how this method recovered episodes that the corporation did not retain. At the turn of the 21st century, the BBC established its Archive Treasure Hunt, a public appeal to recover lost productions, which has had some successes.

The BBC also has close contacts with the National Film and Television Archive, which is part of the British Film Institute and its "Missing Believed Wiped" event which was first held in 1993 and is part of a campaign to locate lost items from British television's past. There is also a network of collectors who, if they find any programmes missing from the BBC archives, will contact the corporation with information—or sometimes even the actual footage. Some examples of programmes recovered for the archives are Doctor Who, Steptoe and Son, Till Death Us Do Part, Dad's Army, Letter from America, The Likely Lads, and Play for Today.

ITV
The BBC was not alone in this practice: the franchise holders that formed its commercial rival ITV also wiped videotapes and destroyed telerecordings, leaving gaps in their archive holdings. The former nature of the ITV network, in which private independent companies were awarded franchises to serve geographical areas for a set period of time, meant that when companies lost their franchise, their archives were often sold to third parties and became fragmented, and/or risked being destroyed, as ownership and copyright remained with the production companies, rather than with the network.

Most of the archives of two ITV contractors ABC Weekend TV and Associated-Rediffusion were destroyed after 1968 when they were merged to become Thames Television. Associated-Rediffusion's archive suffered considerably more damage than ABC's, leaving little of No Hiding Place, The Rat Catchers, and other programmes. Almost all of the entire first series of The Avengers was erased shortly after transmission (only a few episodes survive in their entirety, along with the first 15 minutes of the very first episode). The few surviving tapes of Associated-Rediffusion belong to many different organisations, as the majority of Associated-Rediffusion's tapes were  disposed of, although in recent years there have been occasional discoveries, such as a 1959 episode of Double Your Money, and the remaining missing episode of Around the World with Orson Welles, found by Ray Langstone in 2011. Most material from the 1960s also only survives as telerecordings. Some early episodes are also believed to be damaged or in poor quality, whereas much of the output of other broadcasters – such as many early episodes of The Avengers which were shot in the electronic studio rather than on film, produced by ABC – have been destroyed. Many master tapes belonging to ATV have since deteriorated due to bad storage and are unsuitable for broadcasting. In particular, the ATV version of the popular soap Crossroads is missing 2,850 episodes of its original 3,555. Also often largely lost are quiz shows; few editions exist of the 1970s version of Celebrity Squares with Bob Monkhouse, or Southern's children's quiz Runaround. Many early music programmes, such as Ready Steady Go are poorly represented. Of more than 50 episodes produced, only the initial episode of The Adventures of Twizzle, the first TV series produced by Gerry Anderson, is known to survive as of 2022.

The original (unbroadcast) black-and-white recording of the premiere episode of the British series Upstairs, Downstairs (1970–1975) does not exist in any form, with the possible exception of a few stills and the location footage which features at the start of the transmitted shot-in-color rerecording of the episode. The original recording took place on 13 November 1970, and was in monochrome, owing to a dispute with studio technicians, the so-called Colour Strike, who refused to work with colour recording equipment as part of a work to rule. The following five episodes were also recorded in monochrome, before the dispute ended with the recording of episode 6 in color on 12 February 1971. After the entire thirteen-episode season run had been recorded, it was decided to rerecord the first episode in colour to gain the highest possible audience for its first UK transmission and to help with overseas sales. The re-recording took place on 21 May 1971, and the series' UK debut was on 10 October 1971. The original monochrome recording was never transmitted and was wiped. All of the other five black-and-white episodes from Series 1 survive.

The state of the archives varies greatly between the different companies; Granada Television holds a large number of its older black-and-white programmes, the company having an unofficial policy of retaining as much of its broadcast material as possible despite financial hardship in its early years. This includes the entirety of the soap opera Coronation Street which is now held at the Yorkshire Television archive, which itself possesses largely intact archives, although some early colour shows from the late 1960s and the early 1970s, such as the entire output of the drama Castle Haven, the first two series of Sez Les and the children's variety show Junior Showtime are believed wiped. The former ITV company Thames Television also has a significant library.

The archive of networked programmes made by Southern Television, for example, is now owned by the otherwise-unconnected Australian media company Southern Star Group but Southern's regional output is in the hands of ITV plc.

Furthermore, responsibility for archive preservation was left to individual companies. For example, ITV has no record of its live coverage of the 1969 Moon landings after the station responsible for providing the coverage, London Weekend Television, wiped the tapes. Of the 96 British inserts to the 1980s franchised Anglo-American-Canadian children's show Fraggle Rock, only 12 are known to exist, as the library of the British producer (TVS) has been sold and subsequently split up.

In recent years, the trend of preserving material has started to change. The archives of Westward Television and Television South West are now held in trust for the public as the South West Film and Television Archive, whilst changes in legislation mean that ITV companies which lose their franchises must donate their archives to the British Film Institute. However, the change of ITV from a federal structure to one centralised company means that changes of regional companies in the future seems highly unlikely.

No copies of The Adventures of Francie & Josie exist, as most of Scottish Television's early shows were destroyed in a fire in late 1969 (although some sources state 1973). The Adventures Of Francie & Josie was made from 1961 to 1965 by STV.

Most editions of the anarchic British children's Saturday morning television series Tiswas were transmitted live without any official recording, and many of the original master tapes of such editions as recorded by the broadcaster were wiped or deteriorated after the series was canceled in 1982. When a series of Tiswas highlight compilation tapes was released on video in the early 1990s (followed in 2006 by a DVD), much of the footage appeared to have been culled from the off-air recordings of members of the public.

Recovery of missing programmes
Since the BBC library was first audited in 1978, missing programmes or extracts on either film or tape are often found in unexpected places. An appeal to broadcasters in other countries who had shown missing programmes (notably Australia, New Zealand, Canada, and African nations such as Nigeria) produced "missing" episodes from the archives of those television companies. Episodes have also been returned to broadcasters by private film collectors who had acquired 16mm film copies from various sources.

Two Series 1 episodes of The Avengers (an ABC Weekend TV production) which were thought to be missing were recovered from the UCLA Film & Television Archive in the United States.

It emerged in September 2010 that more than 60 recordings of BBC and ITV drama productions originally sent for broadcast in the United States by the PBS station WNET (which serves New York City and New Jersey) had been found at the Library of Congress.

The BBC sitcom Steptoe and Son is completely intact, although approximately half of the colour episodes only exist in monochrome; this was after copies of episodes thought to be lost were recovered in the late 1990s from early non-broadcast standard video recordings made for writers Ray Galton and Alan Simpson by BBC technicians. For many years  the pilot episode of Are You Being Served? survived only in black and white, appearing in this form on the 2003 DVD release of the show. In 2009, a colour version was reconstructed when it was realised that the black and white film reel had actually recorded sufficient colour information as a dot crawl pattern to allow colour recovery.

A few audio recordings of Till Death Us Do Part have been recovered, as well as an extract of the pilot and two episodes from series three.

In the various sales of rights for Who Wants to Be a Millionaire?, Series 1-4 from the UK edition were assumed to have been lost forever. However, in 2015, Challenge, a British channel repeating game shows, announced they had been found and were rebroadcast, though some episodes in that set remain missing and unfound.

Copies of several compilations from the British 1960s comedy At Last the 1948 Show, held by many to be a forerunner of Monty Python's Flying Circus, were discovered in the archives of the Swedish broadcaster SVT, to whom the producers Rediffusion London had sold them upon the companies' loss of its broadcasting licence. Their recovery enabled the reconstruction of otherwise missing original editions of the programme, meaning most of the series exists in visual form.

Off-air home audio recordings of television programmes have also been recovered, at least preserving the soundtracks to otherwise missing shows, and some of these (particularly from Doctor Who) have been released on CD by the BBC following restoration and the addition of narration to describe purely visual elements. Tele-snaps, a commercial service of off-screen shots of programmes often purchased by actors and television directors to keep a record of their work in the days before videocassette recorders, have also been recovered for many lost programmes.

Preservation of the current archive
Advances in technology have resulted in old programmes being transferred to new digital media, where they can be restored or (if they are damaged or otherwise cannot be restored) kept from decaying further. In the United Kingdom, archival television recordings of both the BBC and ITV, along with other channels, have often been migrated from the older 2-inch quadruplex and 1-inch Type C videotapes to digital formats.

Live broadcasts in Britain are still not necessarily kept, and wiping of material has not ceased. According to writer and broadcaster Matthew Sweet, there are "big gaps in the record of children's television of the Nineties."

United States

Introduction
In the United States, the major broadcast networks engaged in the practice of wiping recordings until the late 1970s. Many episodes were erased, especially daytime and late-night programming such as daytime soap operas and game shows. The daytime shows, almost all of them having been taped, were erased because they were not perceived as having continuing commercial value (due to the volume of episodes, rerun syndication of such programming was rarely undertaken). In the early 1970s, the passage of Financial Interest and Syndication Rules barred the networks from syndicating their own archived programming; intended to encourage more local and independent content, it had the unintended consequence of prompting the networks to discard tapes that syndication companies had no interest in distributing (especially those in black and white).

Videocassette recorders, first introduced in the US with Cartrivision in 1972, were uncommon until the early 1980s. It is thought unlikely that lost television episodes exist in the collections of individuals, though this occasionally happens. Home audio recordings, however, were relatively common at the time, and audio recordings of these episodes are somewhat more common. One example of an early home video recording being the only surviving footage of an event is a clip of John Lennon visiting the announcers' booth during a 1974 Monday Night Football broadcast. ABC lost the footage of this event, but a private collector's copy appears in The Beatles Anthology. Similarly, home kinescopes of World Football League recorded as game film serve as the only surviving copies of several games in that league's short history.

The success of cable television networks devoted to reruns of genres perceived as being of low value and thus discarded eventually suggested this was false, as the large number of episodes required for a daily program made even a short-run game show a candidate for syndication.

The early years

Most of the earliest American mechanical television programs of the early 1930s, including The Television Ghost, Piano Lessons and variety shows by Helen Haynes and Harriet Lee, are considered lost, as no methods existed to preserve them. Only promotional pictures of the shows still exist.

Almost no audio or film material of any television shows from prior to 1948 exist. One of the few exceptions was Hour Glass, an early variety show that ran from 1946 to 1947 and was preserved in the form of audio and, in the case of one episode, still pictures. The debut broadcast of The Ed Sullivan Show (then called Toast of the Town) from June 20, 1948, is considered lost. The episode featured what is almost certainly the first television appearance of the comedy act of Dean Martin and Jerry Lewis.

Programs in the early days of television were live broadcasts which are lost because they were not recorded. Most of the prime-time programs that were preserved are kinescopes. This was also a common practice for broadcasting live TV shows to the west coast, as performers often performed a show back-to-back, but never three times in succession. Daytime programs, however, were generally not kinescoped for preservation (although many were temporarily kinescoped for later broadcast, episodes recorded in this way were usually discarded).

Networks and stations

CBS
Hosting sequences nearly always featuring celebrities, were sometimes made for telecasts of family films, such as for the first nine telecasts of MGM's The Wizard of Oz by CBS from 1956. It is not known if those made for Oz survived since they have not been seen since 1967. One hosting sequence from that era that does survive is the one Eddie Albert  made for the 1965 CBS telecast of The Nutcracker, starring Edward Villella, Patricia McBride, and Melissa Hayden. It has even been included on the DVD release of the program.

DuMont
During the period the DuMont Television Network (1946–1956) remained active, officials of the DuMont network wished to keep its programs as intact as possible. However, the network ceased to exist in 1956 and its archive was discarded in the 1970s. Nearly the entire film archive consisting of approximately 175 television series are missing, presumed destroyed. From the ten years of this network, only about 100 kinescope and originally film episodes of DuMont series survive at the Library of Congress, UCLA Film and Television Archive, the Paley Center for Media in New York, Chicago's Museum of Broadcast Communications, on YouTube or Internet Archive, or in private collections. In 1996, early television actress Edie Adams testified at a hearing in front of a panel of the Library of Congress on the preservation of American television and video, that little value was given to the DuMont film archive by the 1970s, and that all the remaining kinescoped episodes of DuMont series were loaded into three trucks and dumped into Upper New York Bay. This occurred around 1975, according to sworn testimony, to clear room at the New York City warehouse where it was previously being stored. See List of surviving DuMont Television Network broadcasts for more info.

Of the over 20,000 shows carried by DuMont in its ten-year existence, approximately 350 or so episodes of DuMont programming are known to exist today, less than two percent of its total output. The remainder were either never recorded (e.g., NFL on DuMont) or were dumped in the earlier purges. At least one of DuMont's shows were archived on its own: professional wrestling from the Capitol Wrestling Corporation (the direct predecessor to WWE), whose footage of wrestling matches from Madison Square Garden III as well as many matches of 1950s wrestling star Gorgeous George survive as part of WWE Libraries.

ESPN
The first live sporting event broadcast by ESPN was the first game of the 1979 Softball World Series in men's professional slow-pitch softball. Roughly 20 years later, the manager of the Kentucky Bourbons, losers in the series, contacted ESPN about acquiring a copy of that game, and was told that this was the only lost broadcast in the network's history. However, it was later found that the owner of the series-winning Milwaukee Schlitz had previously purchased a copy of this broadcast, and still had the tapes in his possession. The tapes were produced and eventually became the centerpiece of an E:60 episode that aired as part of the network's 40th anniversary celebration in 2019.

NBC
NBC reused the tapes of ventriloquist Shari Lewis's 1960–1963 Saturday morning children's program The Shari Lewis Show, to record coverage of the 1964 Democratic and Republican National Conventions. Lewis said in an interview decades later that to her, this was a shame, since the shows were beautifully done as a showcase of NBC's early color broadcast work.

The Macy's Thanksgiving Day Parade has a majority of its telecasts lost. Many parades were either un-recorded, discarded, or wiped entirely after their only broadcast. Only two parade telecasts from 1980 or prior exist in their entirety (1959, 1976); four others survive only via audio recordings that are up for sale online. Many clips of the NBC telecasts were shown in anniversary specials, showing that some of their telecasts exist. NBC also broadcast the parade locally in 1939 and during the mid-to-late 1940's, but those are also lost, as professional television recording did not exist until after World War II.

The joint Japanese and English masters for the original 1960s version of Tetsuwan Atom/Astro Boy were destroyed in 1975 by NBC after the syndication of the series ended and Tezuka Productions, which was undergoing bankruptcy at the time refused them for lack of funds to receive them. When The Right Stuf gained the license for the series, they were forced to find broadcast copies of the show and mate them with English sound masters that were still extant.

Program types

Award shows
Several award shows from the 1950s and 1960s, such as the Academy Awards and the Emmy Awards, only survive in kinescope format. From 1957 to 1965, the Academy Awards were taped in black and white, but only survive in kinescope format for overseas distribution, especially for the European TV audiences, which used another system (625 lines as opposed to 525 lines), as the tapes used for late broadcasting were reused. All of the taped broadcasts of the Academy Awards from 1966 onward (the first to be broadcast in color) remain intact.

Children's programs
Approximately half of the episodes of 1957 syndicated cartoon Colonel Bleep are missing. The entire master archive was stolen in the early 1970s and not recovered. The current collection is taken from  tapes sent out to individual stations, approximately half of which have been found.

Sixty episodes of the long-running show Sesame Street are missing from the archives of Sesame Workshop. This list of lost episodes includes the debut of long-running cast member Linda and Oscar the Grouch's pet worm, Slimey. Some of these episodes only exist dubbed in German from the show's German-language version, Sesamstraße, while raw footage containing street scenes for some of the lost episodes is believed to exist somewhere in the archives.

The Paul Winchell Show, also known as The Paul Winchell and Jerry Mahoney Show was a children's show hosted by ventriloquist and voice actor Paul Winchell on Metromedia Television's KTTV in Los Angeles. All of the episodes are said to have been lost after station management vindictively erased tapes in 1970 in retaliation after Winchell refused Metromedia's syndication deal and Winchell's offer to buy the tapes for $100,000.00. Winchell sued Metromedia in 1986 and was awarded $17.8 million, in total for the value of the tapes and in damages against Metromedia. Metromedia subsequently appealed to the Supreme Court, but lost.

In 1995, when Hallmark Cards acquired the catalogue of the American animation studio Filmation, they converted all the studio's series from NTSC to PAL. According to Entertainment Rights, which acquired the Filmation library in 2004, Hallmark discarded Filmation's original master tapes after they were converted.

Comedy, talk shows and music
Little of the first sitcom, The Mary Kay and Johnny Show, remains today. It was initially live and not recorded, but later in its run kinescopes were made for rebroadcasting. Fragments of episodes and one complete installment are known to exist.

The Louisiana Hayride television program, broadcast in Shreveport, Louisiana and other local areas, featured the first television appearance of Elvis Presley, but only an audio recording taken from the acetate disc of Presley's complete performance, singing "Tweedlee Dee", "Money Honey", "Hearts of Stone", "Shake, Rattle and Roll", "That's All Right" and "You're a Heartbreaker" on the program, has survived. The original broadcast date was March 5, 1955.

The 1957 CBS production of Rodgers and Hammerstein's Cinderella starring Julie Andrews was believed to be lost for years. It was rediscovered in the late 1990s, but only in black-and-white kinescope; the original color broadcast has been lost. The kinescope has since been released on DVD.

A number of episodes of the 1964-65 sitcom My Living Doll, originally broadcast on CBS, are either lost or only survive in poor condition. The 2011 DVD release of the first half of the season includes an on-screen plea to anyone who might have prints of the missing episodes.

Many of Ernie Kovacs's videotaped network programs were also wiped. During different times as comedian, writer, and performer Kovacs had programs on all four major television networks (ABC, CBS, DuMont, and NBC). After Kovacs's death, the networks wiped many programs. Kovacs's widow Edie Adams obtained as many programs and episodes as she could find, donating them to UCLA's Special Collections.

Almost all of NBC's The Tonight Show with Jack Paar and the first ten years (1962–1972) hosted by Johnny Carson were taped over by the network or destroyed and no longer exist. Carson's shows were preserved by NBC into the early 1970s, but then thrown out to free storage space after the show moved to Burbank, California. When Carson later learned of their destruction, he was furious. Selected sequences from the 1962–1972 era survive and were often replayed by Carson himself (particularly in the months preceding his retirement in 1992) and have been released to home video; some audiotapes and still pictures of those years also exist, including the introduction to Carson's very first broadcast, which was presented with audio and still images during his final appearance hosting Tonight in 1992. Some Paar episodes also survive and have also been released to home video (in this case, DVD). Many of the 1960s Tonight Show episodes only survived in the kinescope format. Dick Cavett's ABC shows were also taped over by his network in favor of other shows produced at ABC's studios in New York.

Most of the 1980s talk show Hot Seat with Wally George broadcast before the show going into syndication were destroyed; the producing station (KDOC-TV in the Orange County, California area) could not afford to archive the show. Many episodes that were nationally syndicated do exist.

Game shows
Game shows, more than any other genre, were prone to being lost. Many games between 1941 and 1980 lasted for time periods that were so short (some measured in a span of weeks or even days) that the networks felt it unnecessary to retain them, whereas recycling the tapes would be more profitable and less of an effort than attempting to sell the series in reruns, in an era before cable television.

Almost all daytime game shows from the 1970s and before have been destroyed. CBS's archives begin in 1972, ABC's in 1978, and NBC's in 1980. A handful of producers (such as Goodson-Todman) did arrange for the preservation of their shows even during the tape-recycling period. To a lesser extent, Barry-Enright Productions, Chuck Barris Productions, Jay Wolpert Productions, and the post-1980 Merv Griffin productions and to an even lesser extent Heatter-Quigley Productions had the foresight to preserve many of their games for later reruns; for years, these shows dominated the USA Network's game show block, then the Game Show Network (GSN) line-up and now make up a major portion of Buzzr TV's lineup. You Bet Your Life, from the 1950s, as well as The Gong Show, from the 1970s, was saved from destruction only because NBC gave hosts Groucho Marx and Chuck Barris, respectively, recordings they were otherwise going to discard.

The Newlywed Game (ABC, 1966-1974) Most episodes of the original ABC daytime version are lost, and many of those that do survive are said to have deteriorated. However, a handful have been shown on GSN, most notably the 1974 finale. The ABC nighttime version's status is also unknown for similar reasons, although a few of the evening shows have been shown on GSN's former block "Game Show Saturday Night". Most of the syndicated version exists, and has been rerun on GSN in the past.

The original Jeopardy! (NBC, 1964–1975) has less than 1% of its episodes (24 out of 2,753) still in existence.

Approx. 130 episodes of The Hollywood Squares (NBC, 1966–1981) were broadcast on Game Show Network, mostly the 1968 NBC nighttime version and 1971–1976 syndicated episodes, in addition to one daytime episode; NBC allegedly destroyed the remainder when it was announced that GSN acquired the rights to the Squares episodes , although several episodes exist at UCLA's Film and Television Archive.

Snap Judgment (NBC, 1967–1969) is completely destroyed (a rarity for a Goodson-Todman produced show) with only one episode existing on audio tape.

The Big Showdown (ABC, 1974–1975) has only two full episodes surviving, namely the 1974 pilot and episode #67, which aired in March 1975. A video clip of another bonus round exists, along with an ABC promo and an undated audio clip of an opening. An audio recording of the July 4, 1975, finale exists and circulates among collectors.

Second Chance (ABC, 1977), once thought completely lost other than a pilot episode, has three known episodes surviving, with one (the series finale) only existing on audiotape.

High Rollers (NBC and syndication, 1974–1976 and 1978–1980) has only twelve known episodes remaining: two from the first run and ten from the second, including the finale.

Winning Streak (NBC, 1974–1975) has only two known full episodes remaining plus the opening of a third - one surviving episode is noteworthy in that it was intended to air August 9, 1974, but was preempted due to news coverage of Richard Nixon's resignation and inauguration of Gerald Ford)

Eye Guess (NBC, 1966–1969) has only one and a half known episodes remaining.

Let's Make a Deal'''s 1980-81 run, produced in Canada, only has between 33-40 "airable" masters remaining, in addition to several home recordings. The remaining master tapes are largely missing, or otherwise damaged beyond recovery.Sale of the Century's entire original NBC daytime run is gone, save for footage held in museum collections and a handful of clips used in specials. The 1973-74 syndicated version is presumed destroyed as well. The 1980s daytime version is presumed lost through July 12, 1988. No episodes of the daytime version prior to July 13, 1988 have ever aired on USA, GSN, or Buzzr, and the latter has never used any footage prior to that date on social media or in promotions. The July 1988 date was also cited by show staffer Mitt Dawson in a YouTube comment. The 1985-86 syndicated version exists in its entirety.

The second version of Dream House (NBC, 1983–1984) has only a handful of episodes remaining; the show's master tapes were accidentally destroyed by a flood in 2013.

The first daytime version of Wheel of Fortune (NBC, 1975–1989) is nearly destroyed through at least 1979, with a King World representative stating in August 2006 that creator Merv Griffin's production company continued reusing tapes into 1985. GSN aired one episode prior to the first cut-off point, a show from 1976 - as well as two shows prior to the 2nd cutoff point, Pat Sajak's debut as host in 1981 and Vanna White's debut as hostess in 1982. Both episodes were sourced from the Paley Center for Media. Additionally, clips of a March 1978 episode were used for a c.-2004 Total Living interview with original host Chuck Woolery, branded with a then-current (for the interview) GSN logo - the episode Paley Center holds as well.

Most other episodes of pre-1980 game shows are lost. With several exceptions, the majority of the Bob Stewart, Heatter–Quigley, Hatos–Hall, Ralph Andrews, Carruthers Company, Barry & Enright, Jack Barry, Ralph Edwards and Merv Griffin have been destroyed prior to 1980.   Exceptions include Pyramid (Stewart), PDQ which aired in syndication as well as many episodes of Hollywood Squares (Heatter-Quigley), the syndicated Let's Make a Deal) (Hatos-Hall), The Joker's Wild and the 1970s syndicated Tic Tac Dough plus a few rare pilots and "cast aside" episodes.

NBC and ABC continued wiping their game shows well into the 1970s; while ABC ceased in early 1978, NBC continued to wipe some shows into 1980, leaving much of their daytime game show content lost. CBS abandoned wiping these programs by September 1972, largely as a result of their collaboration with Goodson-Todman; as a result, even the network's shorter-lived games (such as Spin-Off and Whew!) still exist in their entirety. Incidentally, all three networks ended their wiping practices during the time Fred Silverman led their respective networks.

As late as the late 1970s, American companies that syndicated game shows, such as Odyssey Productions, were more likely to wipe all their videotapes than the three networks were. The syndicated game show Dealer's Choice, which ran throughout 1974 and 1975 in syndication throughout the United States, is believed to have been almost entirely destroyed. (In contrast, because syndication required dozens of copies of a given episode to be produced to be sent to individual stations, that also increased the possibility that "syndication prints" would survive by not being returned to the syndicator.)

News
Some early news programs, such as Camel News Caravan on NBC, are largely lost. NBC neglected to preserve daily editions of the live two-hour morning program Today until the late 1970s; as a result, only scattered kinescopes and video segments chronicle the first quarter-century of the show's news coverage. Of the program's inaugural edition in January 1952, only the first half-hour and the last fifteen minutes exist for contemporary viewing.

Moving images of Walter Cronkite reading the news in his studio every night for six years (1962–August 2, 1968) are mostly gone.  Exceptions are his coverage of the Cuban Missile Crisis in October 1962 and the November 1963 events in Dallas, Texas: the JFK assassination, the shootings of police officer J. D. Tippit and Lee Oswald and all three funerals, as well as his introduction of the Beatles and his criticism of the Vietnam War.

Douglas Edwards anchored the live five-minute segment The CBS Afternoon News five afternoons a week between 1962 and 1966.  He started the segment immediately after the twenty-five minute broadcast of the Goodson-Todman game show To Tell The Truth.  Not one second from four years' worth of The CBS Afternoon News was preserved in any way.

Studio shots of Peter Jennings inside his ABC studio during his first year there (1965) are also gone.

Vanderbilt University has kept all evening national news telecasts since Monday, August 5, 1968. Only newscasts that lasted a half-hour were saved. During that era until the 1980s, all three networks continued featuring news updates that lasted five minutes or less and were inserted during commercial breaks. As late as the 1980s, very few were preserved.  When anchorwoman Jessica Savitch appeared under the influence of drugs while anchoring NBC News Digest in 1983, total running time of one minute, NBC employees made no effort to preserve it. When her sudden death in a car accident, three weeks after the live telecast, made people curious about her appearance in the segment, it was discovered that an employee of an NBC affiliate had saved it without knowing its value. The affiliate was far away from New York City where Savitch worked.

As of 1997, CBS had saved 1,000,000 videotapes of news reports, broadcasts, stock footage, and outtakes according to a report that year from the National Film Preservation Board. The same report added, "Television stations still erase and recycle their video cassettes", referring to local news programs. Many local stations contract with outside companies for archiving news coverage.

The original slow-scan TV footage of the first human moon landing in 1969, believed to be of significantly higher quality than the standards-converted version broadcast on TV, is missing from NASA's archives. This, among other things, has led to many conspiracy theories about the landings, though both NASA and non-NASA authorities have repeatedly debunked any claims of foul play. See Apollo 11 missing tapes.

Soap operas
Most US daytime soap opera episodes broadcast before 1978 have been lost. The status of episodes, however, varies significantly from show to show. Soaps produced by Procter & Gamble Productions, including Search for Tomorrow, Guiding Light, As the World Turns, The Edge of Night, and Another World began preserving their episodes in 1978. A few scattered episodes, mostly black and white kinescopes, of these series exist from the 1950s, 1960s, and early to mid-1970s. The CBS soaps Love of Life and The Secret Storm, as well as several short-lived shows, suffered the same fate.

ABC's One Life to Live and All My Children were originally owned by their creator, Agnes Nixon, who chose to archive all episodes. However, early episodes of AMC were only saved as black-and-white kinescopes despite being produced and telecast in color. ABC purchased the shows in late 1974; different sources report that Nixon's archive was either lost in a fire or erased. A few black-and-white kinescopes of both series' early years exist, as well as a few color episodes. ABC began full archiving of these soaps at Nixon's insistence when they expanded from 30 minutes to an hour—AMC in 1977, and OLTL in 1978.

Most 1963–1970 episodes of ABC's longest-running General Hospital survive because the series was then owned by Selmur Productions. Few episodes from 1970 to 1977 were saved. Ryan's Hope premiered in 1975, several years before ABC began saving all of its daytime programming, but exists in its entirety as it was originally owned by Labine-Mayer Productions.Dark Shadows, created by Dan Curtis, which ran from 1966 to 1971, has the distinction of being one of the few soap operas to have nearly all of its original episodes preserved. As a result of kinescope, many earlier episodes of which the master film was lost are still available. However, episode #1219 was lost but reconstructed with an audio recording for home video release. The reconstructed episode included, Dark Shadows is at present the only soap opera to be released in its entirety on home video. It also stands as one of the only American soap operas to have reruns syndicated.

Two long-running soaps have full archives: Days of Our Lives, which premiered in 1965, and The Young and the Restless, which premiered in 1973. Both series were originally distributed by Screen Gems.

Though most soap operas made the transition from live broadcast to videotaping their shows during the 1960s, it was still common practice to wipe and reuse the tapes. This practice was due to the high cost of videotape at the time. While soap operas began routinely saving their episodes between 1976 and 1979, several soaps have saved recordings of most or all their episodes. Days of Our Lives  has recordings of all its episodes; its first two episodes exist on their original master tapes, and were aired by SOAPnet in 2005. The Young and the Restless,  Dark Shadows  and Ryan's Hope saved most of their episodes, despite the fact that they debuted during the 1960s and 1970s, before retaining tapes became common practice. Episodes of The Doctors began to be saved no later than December 4, 1967; this is where reruns of the series began when picked up by Retro Television Network in September 2014, and distributor SFM Entertainment claims to have roughly 95% of the series' episodes intact in its library. Episodes of other soaps broadcast during the 1950s to 1970s do exist in different forms and have been showcased in various places online.

Procter & Gamble started saving their shows around 1979. Very few pre-1979 color episodes of the Procter and Gamble-sponsored shows survive, with most extant episodes preserved as monochrome kinescopes. Exceptions include two episodes of The Guiding Light from November 1977 and another from 1973, which have been released on DVD. As the World Turns and The Edge of Night aired live until 1975, the year The Edge of Night moved to ABC and As the World Turns expanded from a 30-minute broadcast to one hour. Both shows began taping episodes in preparation for the move of The Edge of Night to ABC. The Edge of Night's ABC debut is believed to have survived. Overall, the number of surviving monochrome episodes recorded on kinescope outnumber color episodes for these programs.

Agnes Nixon initially produced her series One Life to Live and All My Children through her own production company, Creative Horizons, Inc., and kept a complete archive of monochrome kinescopes until ABC bought the shows from her in 1975. When the network decided to expand All My Children from 30 minutes to a full hour in the late 1970s, Nixon agreed on the condition that the network would begin saving the episodes. ABC complied, and full hour broadcasts began on April 25, 1977. However, different sources indicate that a warehouse fire destroyed the vast majority of the early-1970s kinescopes, or that erasures of the episodes continued. As a result, a few early episodes from these early years survive.

Sporting events

National Football League (NFL)
As of 2011, 1968's Super Bowl II is the only Super Bowl without any surviving telecast recording. A nearly complete color tape of Super Bowl I was discovered in 2005, but kept secret for nearly five years; portions of telecasts up through Super Bowl V are either missing or only exist in black-and-white. NFL Films, the league's official filmmaker, produced their own copies (at a higher quality than a live television broadcast could produce at the time) of the games for posterity.

Super Bowl I was aired by both CBS and NBC (the only Super Bowl to be aired by two networks), but neither network then felt the need to preserve the game long-term; CBS saved the telecast for a few months and re-ran it as filler programming at least once before wiping it. A color videotape containing the first, second and fourth quarters of the telecast from WYOU (the CBS affiliate for Scranton, Pennsylvania, which was then WDAU-TV) was found in 2005 and is in the process of being restored. On January 15, 2016, the NFL Network re-aired the first Super Bowl, featuring audio from NBC Radio and most of the TV network broadcast and newly discovered NFL Films footage of the game. Super Bowl II was aired exclusively by CBS and was long believed to have been erased, but it was later found that the entire telecast fully exists and rests in the vaults of NFL Films. Though NBC's telecast of Super Bowl III exists entirely in color, only half of the CBS broadcast Super Bowl IV broadcast does (the rest was preserved via Canadian simulcasts in black-and-white). The first three quarters of Super Bowl V broadcast by NBC Los Angeles' O&O station KNBC exist, but the fourth quarter is missing, though the Mike Curtis interception and Jim O'Brien game-winning field goal were recovered via news highlights from CBC in Canada. Super Bowl VI also exists in its entirety. It was not until Super Bowl VII that a continuous archive was established, with all Super Bowl telecasts from that point onward existing in their entireties.

Similarly, all of the telecasts of the NFL Championship Games prior to the Super Bowl are believed to have been lost, with all surviving footage of those games coming from separately produced film. The status of most regular season and playoff games from the early years of television up to the immediate years following the 1970 AFL–NFL merger are also unknown. Among the footage that has survived include at least some of NBC's coverage from the 1972 AFC Divisional Playoff game between the Pittsburgh Steelers and Oakland Raiders that featured the Immaculate Reception, as well as the inaugural telecast of Monday Night Football from 1970 between the Cleveland Browns and the New York Jets, though several Monday Night Football games in the ensuing seasons were lost. A 1974 game that featured John Lennon being interviewed by Howard Cosell in the booth only survived due to a home video recording of the game; the game itself was wiped by ABC. CBS kept coverage of a 1978 matchup between the New York Giants and Philadelphia Eagles that would feature the now-infamous Miracle at the Meadowlands, although the existence of many 1978 games on CBS by private collectors shows that the networks by that point started keeping recordings of regular season games. There are rare exceptions of CBS games from 1977 back, but by 1978 the library of most teams is almost fully complete.

The NFL had its own filmmakers, NFL Films, filming the game with its own equipment. Thus, preserving the telecasts on tape was not seen as a priority by the networks when another source was available – though the sportscasters' play-by-play comments, as a result, were lost.

World Football League
Most of the telecasts of the World Football League, which were syndicated nationwide by the TVS Television Network in 1974, were destroyed by TVS. (The ad hoc network refused to carry WFL games in 1975 after the league failed to sign star quarterback Joe Namath; with no national TV revenue, the league folded midway through the season.) Very little broadcast-quality footage survives; fragments of the World Bowl and playoffs have been saved, as have a few regular season games, including the league's inaugural national telecast (which as of 2000 existed only on a fourth-generation copy of a VHS tape).

NFL Films compiled as much footage as it could find from the league for a 2000 episode of its series Lost Treasures, which included segments from most of the broadcast-quality footage and home-recorded kinescopes of very poor quality (mainly used as game film to assess performance) that serve as some of the only footage of the Charlotte Stars. The WFL did not have an in-house films division, but cinematographer Lewis Bice did shoot several highlight reels for promotions and television newscasts; when NFL Films found some of Bice's surviving work, they were surprised to see it was at or near their own quality.

The Rose Bowl
 1958-Ohio State-Oregon: The early minutes of the first quarter, the entire halftime show and early moments of the third quarter, and the final 11 minutes of the game exist.
 1969-Ohio State-USC: The entire game is intact
 1970-Michigan-USC: The entire game is intact
 1971-Ohio State-Stanford: The 2nd quarter all the way to 49 seconds left in the game exist
 1972-Michigan-Stanford: The entire game is intact
 1973-USC-Ohio State: The entire game is intact
 1974-USC-Ohio State: Two minutes left in the second quarter all the way to the end of the game exist.
Every Rose Bowl game since 1975 exists in their entireties.

World Series telecasts
All telecasts of all World Series games starting in 1975 (Reds–Red Sox) are known to exist in full. What follows is the known footage of World Series telecasts prior to 1975:
 1952 (Yankees–Dodgers) – Games 6–7 are intact.
 1955 (Yankees–Dodgers) – Only the first half of Game 5 is known to exist.
 1956 (Yankees–Dodgers) – Only the last three innings of Game 2 are known to exist. Game 3 is intact minus the second and third inning. Game 5 (Don Larsen's perfect game) is intact minus the first inning, and was aired on January 1, 2009, during the MLB Network's first broadcast day.
 1957 (Yankees–Braves) – Game 1 is intact by way of a print from the United States Armed Forces Radio and Television Service. Game 3 is intact, minus a snip of Tony Kubek's second home run in the top 7th inning. Games 6 (most of the first six innings) and 7 reportedly exist as well.
 1960 (Yankees–Pirates) – Game 7 (with Bill Mazeroski's series winning home run) was found intact on kinescope in December 2009 in the wine cellar of Pirates' part-owner Bing Crosby, who had the game recorded at his own expense. MLB Network aired it in December 2010.
 1961 (Yankees–Reds) – Half-hour segments of Games 3 (the first two innings and the 9th inning), 4 (the 4th and 5th innings), and 5 (open and top of the 1st inning) are known to exist.
 1963 (Yankees–Dodgers) – Game 3 is intact.
 1965 (Twins–Dodgers) – All seven games were preserved by the CBC on kinescope.
 1968 (Tigers–Cardinals) – All seven games were preserved by the CBC on kinescope.
 It is likely the 1965 and 1968 Series were preserved by the CBC due to the Twins' and Tigers' proximity to Canada; the country would not get its own MLB team until the Montreal Expos began play in 1969.
 1969 (Orioles–Mets) – Games 1–2 were preserved by the CBC on kinescope, while Games 3–5 exist on their original color videotape from "truck feeds".
 1970 (Orioles–Reds) – Games 1–4 were preserved by the CBC on kinescope, while Game 5 exists on its original color videotape from the "truck feed". Color fragments of the first 4 games exist as well.
 1971 (Orioles–Pirates) – Games 1–2 and 6–7 are intact, while Games 3–5 only partially exist and Game 4 (the first World Series night game) is near-complete.
 1972 (A's–Reds) – Game 4 is intact, along with nearly all of Game 5 and a fair chunk of Game 2. Fragments exist for Games 1, 3, and 6, while Game 7 was missing until it was found in September 2017 with the 7th inning to the end intact.
 1973 (A's–Mets) – Game 1 is intact, Game 2 is missing the last inning and a half (including both Mike Andrews plays), Game 3 is complete minus most of the 10th inning and the 11th inning, Game 4 is intact from the pregame show to the top of the 4th inning, and Game 5 has fragments of the first seven innings and the entirety of the last two innings. About 30 minutes of excerpts from Game 6 survive, while Game 7 cuts off with one out at the top of the 9th inning.
 While the last inning and a half of Game 2 is missing from the Major League Baseball/NBC copy, the Andrews plays (totaling about 60 seconds of coverage) survived because, after the World Series, NBC put together a 20-minute presentation tape narrated by Curt Gowdy to submit to the Peabody Awards in order to get consideration for an award for their coverage by the committee; the tape includes the two Andrews plays with Gowdy and Tony Kubek's calls and analysis of them. The presentation tape is held by the Peabody vault, creating a case where "reconstructing" a game in an incomplete format would require going to two different outlets.
 1974 (A's–Dodgers) – Games 1–4 are complete. Game 5 is near intact, but the top of the 9th inning is missing and only exists on the original radio broadcast.

League Championship Series telecasts
For the League Championship Series telecasts spanning from 1969 to 1975, only 2 games survived, one is Game 2 of the 1972 American League Championship Series (Oakland–Detroit) is known to exist; however, the copy on the trade circuit is missing the Bert Campaneris–Lerrin LaGrow brawl. The other is Game 1 of the 1973 National League Championship Series that was covered by New York's then-called WOR-TV and it featured the game all the way up to 2 outs in the bottom of the 8th inning.

There are some instances where the only brief glimpse of telecast footage of an early LCS game can be seen in a surviving newscast from that night.
 Clips of Game 5 of the 1972 National League Championship Series featuring the then-Cincinnati Reds announcer Al Michaels calling the two crucial plays of the game, the game-tying home run by Johnny Bench and wild pitch bringing home George Foster with the series-clinching run, are available.
 The last out of the 1973 National League Championship Series as described by Jim Simpson was played on that night's NBC Nightly News, but other than that the entire game is gone.
 All 3 scoring plays and the last out of Game 4 of the 1974 American League Championship Series was played on that night's CBS Evening News.
 On the day the New York Mets and Baltimore Orioles wrapped up their respective League Championship Series in 1969, a feature story on the CBS Evening News showed telecast clips of the ALCS game (albeit with no original sound). This is all that likely remains of anything from that third game of the Orioles–Twins series.

While all telecasts of World Series games starting with 1975 are accounted for and exist, the LCS is still a spotty situation through the late 1970s:
 1976 ALCS – Games 3 and 5 are intact, from the ABC vault.
 1976 NLCS – Game 3 is intact, albeit an off-air recording taped in the Portland market. Apparently, this copy is the only extant version because the ABC vault copy has no sound.
 1977 NLCS – Game 3 is intact, from the Philadelphia Phillies' local NBC affiliate. A copy is held by Major League Baseball, who also appears to have Game 4 as well.
 1977 ALCS – Game 5 is intact, with both the WPIX and NBC versions existing through off-air recordings.
 Clips of these games may be seen in highlight shows such as Yankeeography. It is believed that incomplete tapes of the ALCS exist. It is possible these games are not shown in part because the audio quality is poor. A common method of getting around such deficiencies would be to overlay a radio telecast or narration by a player or commentator where gaps exist.
 1978 ALCS – All four games (ABC version) are intact via off-air recordings.
 1978 NLCS – Game 4 is intact, again from off-air recordings.

NBA Finals

 1962: Celtics–Lakers — Only 24 minutes of Game 7's second half were aired on NBA's Hardwood Classics in March 2005.
 1963: Celtics–Lakers — Game 6 is intact.
 1964: Celtics–Warriors — Second half of Game 4 exists.
 1965: Celtics—Lakers — only half of the second quarter and the early portions of the third quarter of Game 1 exist.
 1969: Celtics–Lakers — only the entire 4th quarter of Game 7 exists.
 1970: Lakers–Knicks — Game 7 is intact.
 1971: Bucks–Bullets — only nearly all of the second half of Game 4 exists.
 1972: Knicks–Lakers — Game 5 is intact with the exception of the last 3–4 minutes of the game
 1973: Knicks–Lakers — Games 1–4 are missing, while the entire Game 5 wasn't found until 2013 and some of which was shown in the 30 for 30 documentary When The Garden Was Eden.
 1974: Bucks–Celtics — only the 4th quarter and 2nd overtime of Game 6 and the 4th quarter of Game 7 exist.
 1975: Bullets–Warriors — all 4 games are intact.
 1976: Suns–Celtics — all 6 games are intact.
 1977: 76ers–Trail Blazers — all 6 games intact.
 1978: Sonics–Bullets — Games 1, 5, 6 and 7 are intact.

All NBA Finals games since 1979 exist in their entirety.

Preservation by institutions such as museums
Some museums and other cultural institutions, such as the Paley Center for Media, have taken steps to discover and preserve old recordings previously thought to have been wiped or discarded, lost, or misfiled.

General Hospital
Virtually all episodes of General Hospital, from its premiere in April 1963 through to August 1970, are archived at UCLA. The UCLA Film & Television Archive holds a large number of daytime television airings that were spared from the wiping practice.  Also archived there are handfuls of episodes of each soap opera that was on the air from 1971 and 1973, including A World Apart, Where the Heart Is, and Return to Peyton Place.

 Vietnam 
 VTV - Vietnam Television 
Lost programs of the national broadcaster Vietnam Television (VTV) may be due to liquidation of tapes, scratched tapes, etc., but in most cases are due to the erasure of old tapes with new programs, so most of the previous programs on VTV in the pre-2000 period are very difficult to find.7 sắc cầu vồng (1997 - 1998)Câu lạc bộ bạn yêu nhạc (1996 - 1998)CKX (1990s)MTV (1996 - 2000)Nhà nông đua tàiNhững bông hoa nhỏ (1970 - 1997)Nốt nhạc tình yêu (1999 - 2000)Trò chơi liên tỉnh (1996 - 1998)Thể dục buổi sáng Từ ánh mắt đến trái tim (1999 - 2000)VKT (1989 - 1995)

Select list of TV programs with missing episodes

Recovery efforts
The public appeal campaign the BBC Archive Treasure Hunt for the search for lost BBC productions has ended. The BBC still does accept materials and they can be contacted  through the "Donating to the BBC Collection" page of the history on the BBC website.

In 2006, a life-sized Dalek was given to anyone who found and returned one of the missing episodes of Doctor Who. In December 2012, the Radio Times announced it was launching a hunt for more Doctor Who episodes in aid of the show's 50th anniversary, by publishing their own list of missing episodes and setting up a specific address which the public could email if they had any information. Nine lost 1960s episodes were discovered in storage at a television broadcasting station in Nigeria in 2013.

Many lost UK TV broadcasts were found in the personal archives of comedian Bob Monkhouse after his death.

The 1951 unaired pilot of the American sitcom I Love Lucy'' was long believed lost, but in 1990, the widow of actor Pepito Pérez (who played Pepito the Clown), found a copy. It has since been shown on television.

See also

Lost film
Lost media
List of surviving DuMont Television Network broadcasts
Doctor Who missing episodes
British television Apollo 11 coverage
Missing Believed Wiped
Kinescope
Film preservation

References

Further reading

External links
List of Lost TV article category section on The Lost Media Wiki
The Museum of Television and Radio: "Lost" programs
Television Obscurities – TV's Lost & Found: Television — Lost or Missing
2014 BBC Treasure Hunt page
Lost Shows (UK) search engine, TV Brain (formerly Kaleidoscope) website
British TV Missing Episodes Index
Wiped News.Com - A news and features website devoted to missing TV, Film & Radio
The hunt for TV’s lost baseball treasures
Television Obscurities >> Television — Lost or Missing

Television terminology
Television broadcasts